Joel Makin (born 27 October 1994) is a Welsh professional squash player.

Makin was born in Haverfordwest, Pembrokeshire. He played squash at Aberdare Junior Squash Club under coaches Bob Gould, Clive Roberts and Dave Cope, and represented Wales at Under-13s level in 2007. He left Aberdare at 18 and, forgoing university, trained at West Warwickshire Club under the guidance of Rob Owen.

He won the Kent Open in 2017, beating Josh Masters in straight sets, and the Tring Open in 2018. He reached the semifinals of the men’s singles squash competition at the 2018 Commonwealth Games, losing out to Mohd Nafiizwan Adnan in the bronze medal match. Makin qualified for the 2018 British Open Squash Championships where he lost in the first round to Mohamed Abouelghar. He beat the world number one, Mohamed El Shorbagy, to reach the quarterfinals of the Channel VAS Championships in October 2018. As of February 2022, he was ranked number 8 in the World and 1 in Wales.

At the 2022 Commonwealth Games in Birmingham, Makin was selected to represent Wales, and won a silver medal in the Men's Singles.

PSA titles
He has won 4 PSA titles:
 2015 City of Greater Bendigo International (PSA5)
 2017 Kent Open (PSA10)
 2018 Tring Open (PSA15)
 2022 Manchester Open

References

1994 births
Living people
Commonwealth Games competitors for Wales
Sportspeople from Haverfordwest
Squash players at the 2014 Commonwealth Games
Squash players at the 2018 Commonwealth Games
Welsh male squash players
Squash players at the 2022 Commonwealth Games
Medallists at the 2022 Commonwealth Games